Elmadağ is a town and district of Ankara Province in the Central Anatolia region of Turkey. According to 2010 census, population of the district is 43,311 of which 42,099 live in the town of Elmadağ.

Places of interest
Elmadağ (1,862 m.) is also a small mountain beside the town, 45 km from the cıty of Ankara on the road to Kırıkkale. Residents of Ankara often visit the area for picnics and to learn to ski or snowboard during the skiing season which lasts from December until March. There are hotels, student accommodation, cafes and places selling hot-dogs and other apres-ski food.

Administrative divisions

Towns
 Elmadağ

Neighborhoods
 Akçaali
 Kayadibi
 Süleymanlı
 Tekkeköy

Villages
 Aşağıkamışlı
 Deliler
 Ediğe
 Karacahasan
 Kuşçuali
 Taburlar
 Yukarıkamışlı

Notes

References

External links
 District governor's official website 
 District municipality's official website 
 Elmadağ Social Network 

 
Ski areas and resorts in Turkey
Populated places in Ankara Province
Districts of Ankara Province